Nanine Wright (June 3, 1876 – May 23, 1947) was an American silent film actress. She is known for her roles in Risky Business (1920) and the lost film serial Graft as Mrs. Larnigan.

Filmography 

 The Mysterious Witness (1923) as Mrs. John Brant
 Play Square (1921) as Johnny's Mother
 Risky Business (1920) as Grandma
 The Luck of Geraldine Laird (1920) as Mrs. Fitzpatrick
 Destiny (1919) as Mrs. Burton
 Whom the Gods Would Destroy (1919) 
 Rosemary Climbs the Heights (1918) as Hilda Van Voort
 The Square Deal (1918) as Mary Gilson
 The Reed Case (1917) as Mrs. John Reed
The Thief Maker (Short) (1917) as Mrs. Stoddard
 A Blissful Calamity (Short) (1917) as Westie's Mother
 The Circus of Life (1917) as Undetermined Role (uncredited)
 The Phantom's Secret (1917) as Mrs. Lavinia Marston
 The Girl in the Garret (Short) (1917) as Mrs. Dunning
 The Indian's Lament (Short) (1917) as Mrs. Conolly
 The War Waif (Short) (1917) as Grandmother
 The Bubble of Love (Short) (1917) as Mrs. Seton
 A Child of Mystery (1916) Mrs. Andrews
 Wanted: A Home (1916) as The Widow
 The Whirlpool of Destiny (1916) as Mother Giles
 As in a Dream (Short) (1916) as Mrs. Robbins
 Naked Hearts (1916) as Cecil's Mother (as Nannie Wright)
The Beloved Liar (Short) (1916) as Mrs. Quinby
The Flirt (Short) (1916) as Mrs. Madison (as Nannine Wright)
 Graft (A lost Serial of 15 episodes) (1915) as Mrs. Larnigan
Liquor and the Law
The Tenement House Evil 
The Traction Grab 
Grinding Life Down 
America Saved from War 
Old King Coal 
The Insurance Swindlers 
The Patent Medicine Danger
 ''The Shot (Short) (1915) as Mrs. Garrett

References

External links
 

English silent film actresses
1876 births
1947 deaths
20th-century English actresses
People from Oregon, Ohio